The Ba 'Alawi sadah or Sadah Ba 'Alawi are a group of Hadhrami Sayyid families and social group originating in Hadhramaut in the southwest corner of the Arabian Peninsula.  They trace their lineage to Sayyid al-Imam Ahmad al-Muhajir bin Isa al-Rumi  born in 873 (260H), who emigrated from Basra to Hadhramaut in 931 (320H) to avoid sectarian violence, including the invasion of the Qaramite forces into the Abbasid Caliphate.

The origin
The word Sadah or Sadat is a plural form of word  (Sayyid), while the word Ba 'Alawi or Bani 'Alawi means descendants of Alawi (Bā is a Hadhramaut dialect form of Bani).  In sum, Ba'alawi are Sayyid people who have a blood descendant of the Islamic prophet Muhammad through Alawi ibn Ubayd Allah ibn Ahmad al-Muhajir.  Meanwhile, Alawiyyin Sayyid term is used to describe descendants of  Ali bin Abi Talib from Husayn ibn Ali (Sayyids) and Hasan ibn Ali (Sharifs).  All people of Ba 'Alawi are Alawiyyin Sayyids through Husayn ibn Ali, but not all people of Alawiyyin family are of Ba 'Alawi.

The Ba 'Alawi tariqa is a Sufi order founded by one of Ahmad al-Muhajir's descendant, Muhammad al-Faqih al-Muqaddam and named after and closely tied to the Ba 'Alawi family.

Imam al-Muhajir's grandson Alawi was the first Sayyid to be born in Hadhramaut, and the only one of Imam al-Muhajir's descendants to produce a continued line; the lineages of Imam al-Muhajir's other grandsons, Basri and Jadid, were cut off after several generations.  Accordingly, Imam Al-Muhajir's descendants in Hadhramaut hold the name Bā 'Alawi ("descendants of Alawi").

The Ba 'Alawi Sadah have since been living in Hadhramaut in Southern Yemen, maintaining the Sunni Creed in the fiqh school of Shafi'i.  In the beginning, a descendant of Imam Ahmad al-Muhajir who became scholar in Islamic studies was called Imam, then Sheikh, but later called Habib.

It was only since 1700 AD they began to migrate in large numbers out of Hadhramaut across all over the globe, often to practice da'wah (Islamic missionary work).  Their travels had also brought them to the Southeast Asia.  These hadhrami immigrants blended with their local societies unusual in the history of diasporas. For example, the House of Jamalullail of Perlis is descended from the Ba 'Alawi. Habib Salih of Lamu, Kenya was also descended from the Ba 'Alawi. In Indonesia, quite a few of these migrants married local women or men, sometimes nobility or even royal families, and their descendants then became sultans or kings, such as in Sultanate of Pontianak or in Sultanate of Siak Indrapura.

People

List of Families
Some of the family names are as follows:

See also
 Alavi (surname)
 Al-Rabithah al-Alawiyyah
 Alids
 Hadhrami people
 Sayyid
 Sharif

References

Further reading

.

External links
 Ba'alawi.com Ba'alawi.com | The Definitive Resource for Islam and the Alawiyyen Ancestry.
Saada Ba Alawi of East Africa Facebook page

Society of Yemen
Hadhrami people
Hashemite people